The Rajya Sabha (meaning the "Council of States") is the upper house of the Parliament of India. West Bengal elects 16 seats and they are indirectly elected by the state legislators of West Bengal. The number of seats, allocated to the party, are determined by the number of seats a party possesses during nomination and the party nominates a member to be voted on. Elections within the state legislatures are held using Single transferable vote with proportional representation.

Current members

Keys:

Alphabetical list of all Rajya Sabha members from West Bengal state 
Alphabetical list by last name

The list is incomplete.
 Star (*) represents current Rajya Sabha members from WB State.

References

External links
Rajya Sabha homepage hosted by the Indian government
Rajya Sabha FAQ page hosted by the Indian government
Nominated members list
State wise list

West Bengal
 

West Bengal-related lists